Escallonia pulverulenta is an evergreen shrub native to the coastal and inner valleys of central Chile, from  above sea level.

References

External links
 ChileFlora

pulverulenta
Flora of Chile